The Bulao Hot Spring is a hot spring in Xinfa Village, Luigui District, Kaohsiung, Taiwan.

History
The hot spring was developed during the Japanese rule of Taiwan.

Geology
The hot spring is located next to Laonong River at an altitude of 550 meters. The water has pH level of 7–7.5 with a 48–60°C temperature.

Architecture
The area around the hot spring is filled with various hotels and resorts.

Transportation
The hot spring is accessible by bus from Kaohsiung Main Station or Zuoying HSR station.

See also
 Taiwanese hot springs

References

Hot springs of Taiwan
Landforms of Kaohsiung
Tourist attractions in Kaohsiung